Gerard Eyre Wriothesley Noel (20 November 1926 – 27 July 2016) was an English author, editor and aristocrat. He was the editor-in-chief of The Catholic Herald from 1982 to 1984 and wrote 20 books.

Early life
The Honourable Gerard Noel was born on 20 November 1926. His father was Arthur Noel, 4th Earl of Gainsborough and his mother, Alice Mary (née Eyre), Countess of Gainsborough. His older brother Anthony succeeded to the earldom in 1927.

Noel was educated at the Worth School in West Sussex and Georgetown Preparatory School at Washington DC. He read Modern History at Exeter College, Oxford, matriculating in 1944. While he was at Oxford, he ran for the presidency of the Oxford Union but lost to Tony Benn.

Career
Noel started his career as a lawyer in 1952. In the 1959 General Election he was the Liberal candidate for Argyll.

Noel served as the editor of The Catholic Herald from 1971 to 1976. He then served as its editor-in-chief from 1982 to 1984. Additionally, he was a contributing writer to Church Times, The Baptist Times and The Jewish Chronicle.

Noel was the author of 20 books. He authored biographies of politicians like Harold Wilson and Barry Goldwater as well as member of the British Royal Family like Princess Alice of the United Kingdom and Victoria Eugenie of Battenberg. He translated The Way to Unity After the Council by Cardinal-Deacon Augustin Bea from Italian into English. He was a Fellow of St Anne's College, Oxford and a Fellow of the Royal Society of Literature.

Personal life and death
Noel married Adele Julie Patricia Were in 1958. They had two sons and a daughter; Robert John Baptist Noel (born 1962) is a Herald at the College of Arms in London. He was a Roman Catholic, and enjoyed a visit with Pope Pius XII at the Papal Palace of Castel Gandolfo in 1947. He was a member of White's, Brooks's, the Beefsteak Club, the Garrick Club, and the Athenaeum Club.

Noel died on 27 July 2016; he was 89 years old.

Works

References

1926 births
2016 deaths
Alumni of Exeter College, Oxford
English newspaper editors
English male journalists
English biographers
English translators
English Roman Catholics
Gerard
20th-century British translators
Younger sons of earls
Male biographers